Jalo may refer to:

 Jalo oasis in Libya
 Jalu, a city in the oasis
 Jalo (name), a Finnish given name and surname (including a list of people with the name)
 Álvaro Jaló (born 1992), Portuguese footballer
 Daniel Fernandes Jaló (born 1994), Guinea-Bissauan footballer

See also 
 Jaloo, Khyber Pakhtunkhwa, a village in Pakistan
 Jalo Bhati, a village in Punjab, India
 Jallo Park, in Punjab, Pakistan
 Gaby Jallo (born 1989), Aramean-Dutch footballer